Trestoncideres laterialba is a species of beetle in the family Cerambycidae. It was described by Martins and Galileo in 1990. It is known from French Guiana, Costa Rica and Suriname.

References

Onciderini
Beetles described in 1990